Awang Husaini bin Sahari is a Malaysian politician who served as the Member of Parliament (MP) for Putatan from May 2018 to November 2022. He is a member of the People's Justice Party (PKR), a component party of the Pakatan Harapan (PH) coalition. He has served as the Vice President of PKR since July 2022. He is also brother of Member of the Sabah State Legislative Assembly (MLA) for Petagas Awang Ahmad Sah Awang Sahari.

Political career

2018, 2022 general elections and Member of Parliament for Putatan (2018–2022) 
In the 2018 general election, his party PKR fielded him to contest the Putatan federal seat, facing  Marcus Mojigoh from the United Pasokmomogun Kadazandusun Organisation (UPKO), a component party of the ruling Barisan Nasional (BN) coalition who was contesting to defend his seat and subsequently won. In the 2022 general election, he was renominated by PH and PKR to contest for the Putatan seat. He lost the reelection very narrowly to Shahelmey Yahya from BN and United Malays National Organisation (UMNO) by a minority of only 124 votes.

Vice President of the People's Justice Party (2022–present) 
On 20 July 2022, 3 days after the 2022 PKR party elections officially ended, he was appointed Vice President of PKR along with Permatang Pauh MP Nurul Izzah Anwar who was in the position for 8 years from 2010 to 2018 and new officeholder Saraswathy Kandasami by PKR president Anwar Ibrahim after the decision was made in the PKR Central Leadership Council (MPP) meeting that night.

Election results

References 

Living people
Members of the Dewan Rakyat
People from Sabah
Malaysian people of Bruneian descent
People's Justice Party (Malaysia) politicians
Malaysian people of Malay descent
Date of birth missing (living people)
Year of birth missing (living people)